Time in the Czech Republic is given by Central European Time (: UTC+01:00) and Central European Summer Time (: UTC+02:00). Daylight saving time is observed from the last Sunday in March (2:00 CET) to the last Sunday in October (3:00 CEST). The Czech Republic has observed Central European Time since 1979. Until 1993 when Czechoslovakia was separated into the Czech Republic and Slovakia, they also had Central European Time and Central European Summer Time. After the summer months, time in the Czech Republic is shifted back by one hour to Central European Time. Like most states in Europe, Summer time (daylight saving time) is observed in the Czech Republic, when time is shifted forward by one hour, two hours ahead of Greenwich Mean Time.

Notation

IANA time zone database 
In the IANA time zone database the republic is covered by Europe/Prague.

See also
List of time zones by country
List of time zones by UTC offset

References

External links
Looking for the current time in the Czech Republic?
Time zone and daylight saving time for Czech Republic
Current local time in Czech Republic
Welcome to the Czech Republic - Time zone